Marmaduke Grove Vallejo (July 6, 1878 – May 15, 1954), was a Chilean Air Force officer, political figure and member of the Government Junta of the Socialist Republic of Chile in 1932.

Early life
Grove was born in Copiapó, Chile, the son of lawyer, José Marmaduke Grove Abalos and Ana Vallejo Burgoa.
His first studies were in School Nº 1 of Copiapó and later at the local Liceum. From a very young age he was interested in the army, and in 1892, was accepted to the Chilean Naval Academy.  Very shortly before graduation, he participated in the so-called “Stale-bread rebellion”, as a result of which he was expelled from the navy. That incident proved to be his turning point and from then on he declared his motto to be an “undying love for the underdogs and for true justice”.

In 1897, Grove was accepted in the Military Academy, from which he graduated as an artillery sub-lieutenant. At the Military Academy, he was a classmate of Carlos Ibáñez del Campo and Arturo Puga Osorio, both of whom he remained in contact with for the rest of his long military and political life. In 1906 he was sent to Germany to specialize in artillery, and remained there until 1911. By 1912 he had become a freemason and the following year he joined the War Academy. Later he was transferred to the Tacna Garrison, where he remained until 1917 during which he married Rebeca Valenzuela, with whom he had six children.

Grove had a brilliant military career, and from 1920 to 1924 he was Under-Director of the Military Academy. After being promoted to Colonel, he was named Director of the Air Force Academy in 1925.

Political career

1924 also marked Grove's beginnings in politics. On September 3, 1924, he had a notorious participation in the incident known as the "saber rattling", where 56 military officers protested against their low salaries. The next day the officers involved created the "military committee" to defend themselves from the government. He was selected to carry the petitions to the president. These included increase of the military salaries, changes to the income tax, constitutional reforms, and changes to the employment code. He also was in charge of obtaining the support from the navy officers, which he got. He also tried his hand at journalism, and had a column in the newspaper La Nación supporting the committee, under the byline of Ekud.

This incident was a turning point. Even though the petitions were approved, the committee was not dissolved. President Arturo Alessandri, noticing that he had lost control over these officers, resigned and left the country on September 10. This led to the creation of a Government Junta, with the participation of Carlos Ibáñez del Campo.

Calais pact
In 1925, Grove was promoted to colonel and started a long period of travels through Europe, as military attaché. When Carlos Ibáñez del Campo became president, he was confirmed as military attaché in London, as a way to keep him outside the country. While in London, he contacted ex-president Alessandri who was also in exile. Together they started to conspire against Ibáñez. On January 17, 1929, together with also exiled General Enrique Bravo and major Carlos Millán, they signed the “Calais pact" and sworn themselves to bring democracy back to Chile. In November of that year, a meeting of the conspirators was discovered at Dover by the Ibáñez agents, and on November 28 he was sent into retirement from the army and deported to Buenos Aires.

The little red plane

Once in Argentina, Grove immediately started to conspire again. On September 21, 1930, he flew to Chile in a little red plane and landed in Concepción. The plan failed and Grove, together with lieutenant Carlos Charlín Ojeda were arrested and deported to Easter Island. He managed to escape from there on board a French corvette bound for Tahiti, and from there he went to Marseilles. Nonetheless he only was able to return to Chile after the fall of Ibáñez on July 26, 1931.

Socialist Republic of Chile
Once back in Chile, President Juan Esteban Montero reincorporated Grove to the Army and on March 17, 1932 promoted him to Air Commodore and named him Air Force Commander-in-chief. Still, Grove continued conspiring against Montero, and toppled him on June 4, 1932 through a military coup. He then proceeded to create the Socialist Republic of Chile. This republic lasted only 12 days.

The Socialist republic was headed by a Government Junta composed of General Arturo Puga, Carlos Dávila and Eugenio Matte. He became Defense minister, a position he held from June 5 to June 16, 1932.

In that short time, the Socialist republic only managed to approve a few social measures, such as the obligation of the Central Bank to grant credits to small mining and agricultural concerns and the return of the pawned articles at the government-owned pawnbroker to their owners. They also established diplomatic relations with the Soviet Union.

The Government Junta was in turn toppled by Carlos Dávila on June 16, 1932, who in turn remained in power for only one hundred days. In the meantime Grove was once again exiled, this time to Easter Island.

Presidential candidate
During the presidential elections of 1932, Grove was nominated as a candidate by the Socialist forces. He was only able to return from his exile on Easter Island two days before the election, but still managed to finish second, behind Arturo Alessandri, with a 17.7% of the vote.

Later life
On April 19, 1933, together with Oscar Schnake, Salvador Allende, and Carlos Alberto Martínez, Grove founded the Socialist Party of Chile.  He became General Secretary of that party in 1938 and president of the Popular Front coalition that won the presidential election that same year with the candidate Pedro Aguirre Cerda.

Grove was elected Senator on May 9, 1934, in a by-election held to replace deceased Senator Eugenio Matte Hurtado, who had died in January of that year. His slogan was, "From the jail to the Senate", because he had to campaign from jail, where he was kept for conspiring against President Alessandri.  As senator he proposed the first plan of Agrarian Reform in Chile in 1939. His slogan this time was, "Neither land without men nor men without land" (Ni tierra sin hombres, ni hombres sin tierra).  He was reelected as a Senator in 1941. He was defeated by Carlos Ibáñez del Campo and retired from the Senate in 1949.

Grove died at the age of 75 on May 15, 1954, at Santiago, Chile.

External links

Official biography by Socialist party 
Biography 
Calais pact and the little red plane 

1878 births
1954 deaths
Heads of state of Chile
Chilean Ministers of Defense
Chilean Air Force generals
Members of the Senate of Chile
Candidates for President of Chile
Leaders who took power by coup
Chilean socialists
Chilean people of English descent
Chilean people of Irish descent
People from Copiapó
20th-century Chilean military personnel